Jingdong Circuit or Jingdong Province was one of the major circuits during the Song dynasty. In 1072 it was divided into two circuits: Jingdong East Circuit and Jingdong West Circuit.

Its administrative area corresponds to roughly the modern provinces of Shandong, northeastern Henan and northwestern Jiangsu.

References
 

Circuits of the Song dynasty
Former circuits in Shandong
Former circuits in Jiangsu
Former circuits in Henan